Mohamed Guizani (born 25 November 1975) is a Tunisian footballer and later manager.

References

1975 births
Living people
Tunisian footballers
Stade Tunisien players
CA Bizertin players
Espérance Sportive de Tunis players
EO Goulette et Kram players
CS Hammam-Lif players
AS Kasserine players
EGS Gafsa players
SC Ben Arous players
Tunisian Ligue Professionnelle 1 players
Tunisian football managers
Olympique Béja managers
Association footballers not categorized by position